Chaolai Football Centre (Simplified Chinese: 朝来足球活动中心) is a football ground in Beijing, China.  It is currently used mostly for football matches.

Football venues in China
Sports venues in Beijing